Palavakam is a locality in the south of Chennai and census town in Chennai district in the Indian state of Tamil Nadu. It is located on the East Coast Road about 6 km south of Adyar.

Demographics
 India census, Palavakam had a population of 14,369. Males constitute 51% of the population and females 49%. Palavakam has an average literacy rate of 74%, higher than the national average of 59.5%: male literacy is 78%, and female literacy is 68%. In Palavakam, 12% of the population is under 6 years of age.

Educational institutions
The First bilingual International School in Chennai, German International School Chennai is situated in 4/391, Ram Garden, Anna Salai, Palavakkam.

References

Cities and towns in Kanchipuram district
Suburbs of Chennai